Gisela Maria Morales Valentin (born 17 December 1987) is an Olympic swimmer from Guatemala. She competed at the 2004 and 2008 Olympics.

She also won two bronze medals at the 2003 Pan American Games. She attended college (and swam for) the USA's Auburn University before transferring to the University of Texas.

Morales served as Guatemala's flag-bearer at the 2004 Olympic Games, where she finished 27th and 26th in the 100m backstroke and the 200m backstroke respectively.

At the 2010 Central American and Caribbean Games, Morales won the Gold Medal in both the 50m backstroke and the 100m backstroke, and the Silver Medal in the 200m backstroke, in a close battle with Mexican competitor Fernanda González.

She represented Guatemala at the 2011 and 2015 Pan American Games.

International competitions
2003 Pan American Games (100 & 200 backs)
2004 Olympics
2005 World Championships
2008 Olympics (100 & 200 backs)
2010 Central American and Caribbean Games (50, 100 & 200 backs)
2011 Pan American Games (100 & 200 backs)

References

External links
 
 

1987 births
Living people
Sportspeople from Guatemala City
Auburn Tigers women's swimmers
Guatemalan female swimmers
Olympic swimmers of Guatemala
Swimmers at the 2004 Summer Olympics
Swimmers at the 2008 Summer Olympics
Swimmers at the 2011 Pan American Games
Swimmers at the 2015 Pan American Games
Pan American Games bronze medalists for Guatemala
Pan American Games medalists in swimming
Swimmers at the 2003 Pan American Games
Central American and Caribbean Games gold medalists for Guatemala
Central American and Caribbean Games silver medalists for Guatemala
Central American and Caribbean Games bronze medalists for Guatemala
Competitors at the 2002 Central American and Caribbean Games
Competitors at the 2006 Central American and Caribbean Games
Competitors at the 2010 Central American and Caribbean Games
Competitors at the 2014 Central American and Caribbean Games
Central American and Caribbean Games medalists in swimming
Medalists at the 2003 Pan American Games